Huduma Kenya Programme is a Kenya Vision 2030 flagship project captured under the Mid Term plan for 2013 – 2017. The Programme was launched by President Uhuru Kenyatta on 7 November 2013 which coincided with the launch of the first Huduma Centre in Kenya at General Post Office (GPO) in Nairobi.

The aim of the Huduma Kenya program is to enhance the access and delivery of Government Services to all Kenyans. Ministry of Public Service, Youth and Gender Affairs is coordinating implementation of the Programme.c.

References

Government of Kenya